The 2019 Canada Winter Games were held in Red Deer, Alberta from 15 February to 3 March 2019. The following is a list of medallists from the games.

Alpine skiing
Men

Women

Archery
Recurve

Compound

Artistic swimming

Badminton

Biathlon
Men

Women

Boxing
Men

Cross-country skiing
Men

Women

Mixed

Curling

Figure skating

Freestyle skiing 

Men

Women

Gymnastics

Artistic
Men

Women

Trampoline

Hockey
The hockey competitions marked the debut for Nunavut in the sport at the Canada Games.

Judo
Men

Women

Ringette

Short track speed skating
Men

Women

Snowboarding

Speed skating
Men

Women

Squash

Table tennis

Wheelchair basketball

References

External links
Results

2019 Canada Winter Games
Ringette competitions